Billacott is a hamlet in east Cornwall, England, United Kingdom. It is situated in the civil parish of North Petherwin (where the 2011 Census population was listed) and is six miles north-west of Launceston.

References

Hamlets in Cornwall